Markus Eriksson and André Göransson were the defending champions but only Eriksson chose to defend his title, partnering Tuna Altuna. Eriksson lost in the quarterfinals to Sander Arends and David Pel.

Arends and Pel won the title after defeating Ivan Nedelko and Alexander Zhurbin 6–0, 6–2 in the final.

Seeds

Draw

References

External links
 Main draw

Tampere Open - Men's Doubles
2019 Men's Doubles